Jeffrey William Nundy (born 29 November 1935) is an English former professional footballer who played as a centre half.

Career
Born in Hull, Nundy joined Huddersfield Town from Bradford City in December 1953. He re-joined Bradford City in July 1957, making 32 league and 2 FA Cup appearances for the club, before retiring in 1960.

Sources

References

1935 births
Living people
English footballers
Bradford City A.F.C. players
Huddersfield Town A.F.C. players
English Football League players
Association football defenders